Zezezino is a rural locality (a village) in Idrinsky District of Krasnoyarsk Krai, Russia.

References

Rural localities in Krasnoyarsk Krai
Idrinsky District